Annów  is a village in the administrative district of Gmina Czerniewice, within Tomaszów Mazowiecki County, Łódź Voivodeship, in central Poland. The population is 187.

References

Villages in Tomaszów Mazowiecki County